Sheykh Jan-e Bazkarbasi (also Romanized as Sheykh Jān-e Bāzkarbāsī) is a village in Rak Rural District, in the Central District of Kohgiluyeh County, Kohgiluyeh and Boyer-Ahmad Province, Iran. At the 2006 census, its population was 53, in 11 families.

References 

Populated places in Kohgiluyeh County